Dunham railway station was located in Little Dunham, Norfolk on the Great Eastern Railway line between Swaffham and Dereham. It closed in 1968 . Beeching's report intended to retain the King's Lynn - Dereham - Norwich line (which was in fact closed).

References

External links
 Dunham station on 1946 O. S. map

Disused railway stations in Norfolk
Former Great Eastern Railway stations
Railway stations in Great Britain opened in 1848
Railway stations in Great Britain closed in 1968
1848 establishments in England
1968 disestablishments in England